Beautiful Minds is a 2021 French-Swiss comedy-drama film directed by Bernard Campan and Alexandre Jollien.

Cast 
 Bernard Campan - Louis Caretti
 Alexandre Jollien - Igor
 Marie Benati - la prostituée
 Marilyne Canto - Judith
  - la mère d'Igor
 Julie-Anne Roth - Nicole
 Tiphaine Daviot - Cathy
 Laëtitia Eïdo - Patricia

References

External links 

2021 comedy-drama films
French comedy-drama films
Swiss comedy-drama films
2020s French films
2020s French-language films